The 2018 Bol Open was a professional tennis tournament played on outdoor clay courts. It was the thirteenth edition of the tournament and part of the 2018 WTA 125K series. It took place in Bol, Croatia, on 5–10 June 2018.

Singles main draw entrants

Seeds 

 1 Rankings as of 28 May 2018.

Other entrants 
The following players received a wildcard into the singles main draw:
  Lea Bošković
  Tena Lukas
  Barbora Štefková

Withdrawals 
Before the tournament
  Jennifer Brady → replaced by  Elena-Gabriela Ruse
  Jana Čepelová → replaced by  Tereza Martincová
  Dalila Jakupović → replaced by  Kristína Kučová
  Johanna Larsson → replaced by  Sílvia Soler Espinosa
  Bernarda Pera → replaced by  Alexandra Cadanțu
  Rebecca Peterson → replaced by  Viktoriya Tomova
  Yulia Putintseva → replaced by  Michaela Hončová
  Stefanie Vögele → replaced by  Sofya Zhuk

Doubles entrants

Seeds 

 1 Rankings as of 28 May 2018.

The following team received wildcard into the doubles draw:
  Anhelina Kalinina /  Marta Kostyuk

Champions

Singles

 Tamara Zidanšek def.  Magda Linette 6–1, 6–3

Doubles

 Mariana Duque Mariño /  Wang Yafan def.  Sílvia Soler Espinosa /  Barbora Štefková 6–3, 7–5

External links 
 Official website 

2018 WTA 125K series
2018 in Croatian tennis
Croatian Bol Ladies Open